John Andrew Sullivan (May 10, 1868 – May 31, 1927) was a U.S. Representative from Massachusetts.

Born in Boston, Massachusetts, Sullivan attended the common and high schools.
He was graduated from the Boston University Law School in 1896.
He was admitted to the bar the same year and commenced practice in Boston, Massachusetts.
He served as member of the Massachusetts State Senate 1900-1902.

Sullivan was elected as a Democrat to the Fifty-eighth and Fifty-ninth Congresses (March 4, 1903 – March 3, 1907).
He declined to be a candidate for renomination.
He resumed the practice of law in Boston, Massachusetts.

He was appointed a member of the Boston Finance Commission in July 1907 and served until the commission expired.
In June 1909, Sullivan became chairman of the permanent Boston Finance Commission. 
He resigned in 1914 to become corporation counsel of Boston. Later, he was a lecturer on municipal government at Harvard University in 1912 and 1913 and then at Boston University Law School from 1920-1925. Sullivan resumed the practice of his profession in Boston.

He died in Scituate, Massachusetts, May 31, 1927 and was interred in Holy Cross Cemetery, Malden, Massachusetts.

References

External links

Notes

1868 births
1927 deaths
Boston University School of Law alumni
Harvard University staff
Boston University faculty
Corporation counsels of Boston
Democratic Party Massachusetts state senators
Politicians from Boston
Democratic Party members of the United States House of Representatives from Massachusetts
19th-century American lawyers
Boston Finance Commission members